The 1964–65 season is the 85th season of competitive football by Rangers.

Overview
Rangers played a total of 54 competitive matches during the 1964–65 season.

Results
All results are written with Rangers' score first.

Scottish First Division

Scottish Cup

League Cup

European Cup

Appearances

See also
 1964–65 in Scottish football
 1964–65 Scottish Cup
 1964–65 Scottish League Cup
 1964–65 European Cup

References 

Rangers F.C. seasons
Rangers